Harishchandrapur College is a college in Pipla, Harishchandrapur in the Malda district of West Bengal, India. The college is affiliated to the University of Gour Banga, offering undergraduate courses.

History

Departments

Arts

Bengali 
English
History
Political Science
Philosophy
Education
Geography

See also

References

External links
Harishchandrapur College
University of Gour Banga
University Grants Commission
National Assessment and Accreditation Council

Education in Malda district
Universities and colleges in Malda district
Colleges affiliated to University of Gour Banga
2008 establishments in West Bengal